Noriyuki Kazaoka (born September 15, 1946) was Grand Steward of the Imperial Household Agency from 1 Jun 2012 – 26 Sep 2016. He was born in Niigata Prefecture and worked at the Ministry of Construction (Japan).

References

1946 births
People from Niigata Prefecture
Living people